The 1944 North Carolina lieutenant gubernatorial election was held on November 7, 1944. Democratic nominee Lynton Y. Ballentine defeated Republican nominee George L. Greene with 69.61% of the vote.

Primary elections
Primary elections were held on May 27, 1944.

Democratic primary

Candidates
Lynton Y. Ballentine, former State Senator
William I. Halstead, State Senator
Jamie T. Lyda

Results

Republican primary

Candidates
George L. Greene
A. Harold Morgan
Robert L. Lovelace

Results

General election

Candidates
Lynton Y. Ballentine, Democratic
George L. Greene, Republican

Results

References

1944
Gubernatorial
North Carolina